The basket hap (Mylochromis lateristriga) is a species of cichlid endemic to Lake Malawi where it is found in the southern portion, preferring sheltered bays with sandy or vegetated substrates.  This species can reach a length of  TL.  This species can also be found in the aquarium trade.

References

Basket hap
Fish described in 1864
Taxa named by Albert Günther
Taxonomy articles created by Polbot